Alexander Hones (born 14 November 1999) is an Austrian footballer who plays as a left-back.

Career

Club career
Born in Wolfern, Hones began his career at Union Wolfern, before joining Union St. Florian in 2009 in later SK Vorwärts Steyr in April 2015. Hones got began playing for the clubs senior reserve team in 2016.

On 21 April 2019, Hones got his professional debut for Vorwärts Steyr's first team in the Austrian 2. Liga against WSG Swarovski Tirol, playing the whole game. He made one further league appearance in the following month and was on the bench for six games in that season.

References

External links
 
 Alexander Hones at ÖFB

Living people
1999 births
Association football defenders
Austrian footballers
2. Liga (Austria) players
Union St. Florian players
SK Vorwärts Steyr players